Springfield Grocer Company Warehouse, also known as the Holland-O'Neal Milling Company, is a historic warehouse building located at Springfield, Greene County, Missouri. It was built about 1925, and is a wide two story building with a four-story central tower.  It measures
approximately 185 feet by 40 feet and is tucked into a hillside.  The building still bears wall signs added by the Springfield Grocer Company, including a
distinctive set of signs advertising their private "Yellow Bonnet" brand of products.

It was listed on the National Register of Historic Places in 2010.

References

Commercial buildings on the National Register of Historic Places in Missouri
Commercial buildings completed in 1925
Buildings and structures in Springfield, Missouri
National Register of Historic Places in Greene County, Missouri
Warehouses on the National Register of Historic Places
Grocery store buildings